John White Brownson III (September 1, 1842 – December 26, 1924) was an American merchant and politician from Wisconsin.

Life
He was born on September 1, 1842, in Gainesville, New York, the son of New York State Assemblyman and Senator John W. Brownson (1807–1860) and Frances L. (Cole) Brownson. The family moved to Sharon, Wisconsin in 1852. During the American Civil War, Brownson served in the 13th Wisconsin Volunteer Infantry Regiment. He achieved the rank of sergeant. Brownson was a merchant in Sharon, Wisconsin and served in public office. Brownson served in the Wisconsin State Assembly in 1882.

Notes

External links

1842 births
1924 deaths
People from Gainesville, New York
People from Sharon, Wisconsin
People of Wisconsin in the American Civil War
Union Army soldiers
Businesspeople from Wisconsin
Members of the Wisconsin State Assembly
Burials in Wisconsin
19th-century American businesspeople